Janka Maŭr (Yanka Mavr; 11 May 1883 – 3 August 1971) was a famous Belarusian writer. Janka Maŭr was actually his pseudonym as his true name was Ivan Michajłavič Fiodaraŭ (Belarusian: Іва́н Міха́йлавіч Фёдараў). His son, Fiodar Fiodaraŭ, was a famous Belarusian physicist.

He was born in Liepāja, Courland, Latvia but was raised in the Belarusian village of Lebianiški (now Lithuania). He graduated from vocational school in Kaunas, then entered a pedagogical school in 1899, but was thrown out for being a member of an underground revolutionary club. Nevertheless in 1903 he passed all the exams as a non-resident student and became a high school teacher. In 1906 took part in the underground meeting of the Belarusian teachers, organized by the famous Belarusian writer Jakub Kołas. 

After his arrest, he could not work as a teacher anymore. He could teach again only in 1911, becoming a geography and history teacher in a private school in Minsk. He worked in different literary genres: satirical, historical, children, etc. His best-known novel is Amok, but his best-selling and perhaps most known book was Palesse Robinsons. Besides writing, he also translated stories into Belarusian from many foreign authors, including Jules Verne, Victor Hugo, Anton Chekhov, and Mark Twain, among others.

Books
 The man is coming (Чалавек ідзе) 1924
 In the country of the Paradise Bird (У краіне райскай птушкі) 1926
 The son of water (Сын вады) 1927
 Amok (Амок) 1928
 The Trip to Hell (Падарожжа ў пекла) 1928
 Palesse Robinsons (Палескія Рабінзоны) 1929
 The story of the future days (Аповесьць будучых дзён) 1932
 Around the world (Вакол свету) 1947
 TVT (ТВТ) 1934, 1949
 Away from the Darkness 1920, 1956-1958
 Fantamobil of professor Cyliakouski (Фантамабіль прафесара Цылякоўскага) 1955

1883 births
1971 deaths
People from Liepāja
People from Courland Governorate
Communist Party of the Soviet Union members
Belarusian science fiction writers
Recipients of the Byelorussian SSR State Prize